The News of the World Tour was the fifth headlining concert tour by the British rock band Queen, supporting their successful 1977 album News of the World. The tour spanned from 11 November 1977 to 13 May 1978 over three tour legs: North America, Europe, and the United Kingdom. Rehearsals for the tour took place at Shepperton Studios in October 1977.

Overview 

Hot off the heels of the A Day at the Races Tour, the band retreated to Wessex Studios to record their sixth studio album, News of the World. A video shoot for the first single off the album, "We Are the Champions," was shot on 6 October 1977 at New London Theatre. Many people from the Queen Fan Club were privately invited to the event to fill up the theatre. After running through four takes of the video, the band played a short live set for the 900 person audience, which served as a warm-up gig for the tour in the coming month. The band then spent the last week of the month rehearsing for the tour, during which, News of the World was released (28 October 1977).

Visually, their show has been revamped for this tour. The News of the World Tour prominently features their brand new lighting rig, "The Crown." The rig was first used for their two shows at Earls Court in June 1977. The full rig cost £50,000 to make, was 25 feet tall by 54 feet wide, and was the world's first mobile lighting rig. The Crown was scaled down for this tour, and built in Boston. The stage outfits have also changed. Instead of starting the show in his white jumpsuit like on the previous tour, Mercury would start the show with a leather jacket on top of his iconic leotards. There also seems to be a larger assortment of leotards in Mercury's arsenal for this tour, such as the black and white checkered outfit (worn on most shows, including the filmed concert in Houston), the black and white striped outfit (featured in Boston, Oakland, and Stockholm), the orange, green, and white checkered outfit (featured in the second night in Philadelphia and the second night in Rotterdam), the full white outfit (featured in the first night in Rotterdam), and the full black outfit (featured in Copenhagen and Hamburg). During the second encore, Mercury would switch to another spandex leotard coated in sparkles. However, for the UK Leg of the tour in 1978, Mercury had ditched the leotards for the main set, and instead wore leather pants and suspenders. This would become his main outfit for the following tour at the end of the year. His outfit for the second encore also changed on the UK leg; Mercury wears a sparkled spandex leotard similar to the one on the previous legs, but it's red instead of white, and the legs have been cut off. As for the other members, Brian May would typically wear a white jacket with black slacks and Nike Cortez sneakers through the main set, and would come out during the rock section of "Bohemian Rhapsody" in poncho-like drapes designed by Zandra Rhodes then for the encores a white shirt with black vest. Roger Taylor would dress in a white, baggy shirt (would switch shirts during "Love of My Life" to a black shirt and wore white pants (first half of show) and black pants (for second half) and sneakers, and John Deacon would casually dress in a shirt, slacks and shoes.

It was the first to feature "We Will Rock You", "We Are the Champions" and "Love of My Life" – three of the anthems that helped make Queen well known for their concerts.

This tour was the first the band performed without an opening act although at some shows on the US leg Cheap Trick served as opening act (namely Portland, Chicago and one of the shows in Los Angeles)

The News of the World Tour is also notable for featuring some of Queen's longest shows, generally lasting two hours per night, in contrast to previous tours, where the shows would last around 1 hour and 40 minutes. The shows in Boston (12 November 1977) and Inglewood (22 December 1977) were particularly lengthy performances, with the concert in Boston clocking in at 2 hours and 25 minutes, and the concert in Inglewood clocking in at 2 hours and 15 minutes, making them the second and third longest shows of Queen's career, respectively.

One of the shows on the North American leg – at The Summit in Houston, Texas – was filmed and is widely available among fans. The Houston concert is considered one of their best bootlegs. Other shows on the tour were filmed by Bob Harris and his crew, those being Atlanta (8 December 1977), Fort Worth (10 December 1977), and Las Vegas (15 December 1977), though no footage from those three performances have been seen. Footage of the pre-show setup from was mis-labeled in some documentaries as being at The Omni in Atlanta, but was in fact at the Summit in Houston.

Setlists
Out of the eleven songs on News of the World, eight would be featured on stage in some capacity, whether it be the full song, or as part of the typical medley that they would perform early in the set. Songs that were performed in full include: "We Are the Champions," "Spread Your Wings," "Sleeping on the Sidewalk," "It's Late," and "My Melancholy Blues." "We Will Rock You" was performed three times during the set: First, it opened the show on playback while Freddie Mercury would walk out on stage and sing the first verse of the song, after which Brian May would finish the song with his guitar solo. The band would then quickly follow up with the fast version of the song, which was notably featured on Live Killers. The third and final performance of the song would be during the encores. This time, the playback would not be present, and instead, Roger Taylor would provide a real drum beat. Only one verse of the song is played again, but the song would be featured in full by the next tour. "Sheer Heart Attack" cut down to only a single verse, but just like "We Will Rock You," the song would eventually be played in full by the following tour. Finally, "Get Down Make Love" would be featured as part of the medley, and thus, the second verse and chorus were cut from the song.

"Sleeping on the Sidewalk" would not last long on stage, as the band only played the song at three shows on the tour before dropping it from the set. The version that was released on the 40th Anniversary Box Set of News of the World comes from the show in Boston on 12 November 1977

Average setlist
This setlist is representative of the performance on 1 December 1977 in New York City, United States. It does not represent all the setlists for the duration of the tour.
"We Will Rock You (Slow)"
"We Will Rock You (Fast)"
"Brighton Rock"
"Somebody To Love"
"It's Late"
"Death on Two Legs"
"Killer Queen"
"Good Old-Fashioned Lover Boy"
"I'm in Love with My Car"
"Get Down, Make Love"
"The Millionaire Waltz"
"You're My Best Friend"
"Spread Your Wings"
"Liar"
"Love of My Life"
"'39"
"My Melancholy Blues"
"White Man"
"The Prophet's Song"
"Guitar Solo"
"The Prophet's Song (Reprise)"
"Now I'm Here"
"Stone Cold Crazy"
"Bohemian Rhapsody"
"Keep Yourself Alive"
"Tie Your Mother Down"Encore
"We Will Rock You"
"We Are The Champions"Encore
"Sheer Heart Attack"
"Jailhouse Rock"
"God Save The Queen"

Selected setlists

Tour dates

Box office score data

Tour band
Freddie Mercury – lead and backing vocals, piano, tambourine on "Keep Yourself Alive"
Brian May – electric guitar, acoustic guitar and backing vocals
Roger Taylor – drums, lead vocals (on "I'm in Love with My Car") backing vocals, tambourine on "'39"
John Deacon – bass guitar and additional vocals

Reception and recollections
In the book The Show I'll Never Forget: 50 Writers Relive Their Most Memorable Concertgoing Experience, novelist Tracy Chevalier recalls attending one of this tour's concerts at the age of 15:

Robert Hilburn of the Los Angeles Times called this concert tour the band's "most spectacularly staged and finely honed show yet".

"We arrived in Las Vegas on Monday," recalled Old Grey Whistle Test presenter Bob Harris, who was travelling with the band for a filmed piece, "and the band weren't playing until Thursday, so we had three days to party… On the Thursday, when the band were playing, they got the four limos to park at the back of the Aladdin. Each of them got in, then the limos drove them round to the front, where they got out and walked into the hotel for the gig. You have to do it; it's the rock 'n' roll way. You can't just walk into the lobby!"

References

External links
Queen Concerts (North America)
Queen Concerts (Europe)

1977 concert tours
1978 concert tours
Queen (band) concert tours